James Reynold Lonborg (born April 16, 1942) is an American former professional baseball right-handed starting pitcher, who played in Major League Baseball (MLB) with the Boston Red Sox, Milwaukee Brewers, and Philadelphia Phillies. Though nicknamed "Gentleman Jim", he was known for fearlessly pitching on the inside of the plate throughout his fifteen-year career.

Life and career
Born in Santa Maria, California, Lonborg attended San Luis Obispo High School and graduated from Stanford University. On August 14, 1963, he was signed as an amateur free agent by the Boston Red Sox.

Lonborg enjoyed his best year in the 1967 Carl Yastrzemski-led Red Sox' "Impossible Dream" season, when he led American League (AL) pitchers in wins (22), games started (39), and strikeouts (246). That year, the Red Sox were involved in a four-way race for the AL pennant with the Detroit Tigers, Minnesota Twins, and Chicago White Sox; the race was reduced to three teams after the White Sox lost a doubleheader to the Kansas City Athletics, on September 27. The Red Sox and Twins faced each other in the season's final series and entered the final day (October 1) tied for first place; the Tigers were half a game out of first and needed to sweep a doubleheader from the California Angels to force a playoff between the winner of the Red Sox–Twins game. Lonborg outdueled Twins ace Dean Chance in that finale, while the Tigers defeated the Angels in the first game but lost the second, putting the Red Sox in the World Series for the first time since . In that World Series against the St. Louis Cardinals, Lonborg pitched game two, tossing what was only the fourth one-hitter in Series history and followed that up with another victory in game five by limiting the Cards to three hits. Called upon to pitch the seventh and deciding game with only 2 days rest, he lasted 6 innings, but allowed 6 earned runs in a 7–2 loss. Teammate Dan Osinski remembered, "Lonborg couldn't break a pane of glass in the bullpen when he was warming up. We all knew that, and [Dick Williams] still started him. You know he could have pitched the bullpen an inning apiece, or something. It just gave Gibson too big a lead against us that we couldn't come back from." Shortly after being fired by the Red Sox, pitching coach Sal Maglie also criticized Williams's handling of Lonborg. "It was obvious Lonborg didn't have it. Williams should have gotten him out sooner, and I told him so. It was a crime that he let a man who'd done such a great job for him all season take a pounding like that. It was degrading." Lonborg received the  Cy Young Award (becoming the first Red Sox pitcher so honored), played in the All-Star Game, and finished prominently in voting for the MLB Most Valuable Player (MVP) award (placing 6th in the voting, with teammate Yastrzemski winning the award).

In December 1967, Lonborg tore the ligaments in his left knee while skiing and his pitching career thereafter was marked by many injuries. He won only 27 games from  through 1971, and was traded along with George Scott, Ken Brett, Billy Conigliaro, Joe Lahoud and Don Pavletich to the Milwaukee Brewers in a ten-player trade that also sent Tommy Harper, Marty Pattin, Lew Krausse and minor-league outfielder Pat Skrable to the Red Sox on October 10, 1971. With the Philadelphia Phillies needing to improve its pitching staff beyond Steve Carlton, both Lonborg and Brett were acquired along with Ken Sanders and Earl Stephenson from the Brewers for Don Money, John Vukovich and Bill Champion on October 31, 1972. He spent the next six and a half seasons with Philadelphia before his release, midway through the 1979 season.

Lonborg's MLB career statistical totals include a 157–137 record with 1,475 strikeouts, a 3.86 earned run average (ERA), 90 complete games, 15 shutouts, and  innings pitched in 425 games. Lonborg was selected to the Boston Red Sox Hall of Fame in 2002.

After retiring, Lonborg attended the Tufts University School of Dental Medicine, and graduated in 1983. He worked as a general dentist in Hanover, Massachusetts, until he retired in 2017. He is active in many nonprofit organizations, including Catholic Charities, Little League Baseball, and The Jimmy Fund. Lonborg lives in Scituate, Massachusetts.

On the Boston-based sitcom Cheers, the photo of Sam Malone pitching is actually that of Lonborg. At times, Sam also wore Lonborg's number 16 Red Sox jersey.

See also
 List of Major League Baseball annual strikeout leaders
 List of Major League Baseball annual wins leaders
 List of Major League Baseball career hit batsmen leaders

References

External links

Jim Lonborg at SABR (Baseball BioProject)
Jim Lonborg at Baseball Almanac
Jim Lonborg at SoSH (Sons of Sam Horn)

1942 births
Living people
American dentists
American League All-Stars
American League strikeout champions
American League wins champions
Baseball players from California
Boston Red Sox players
Cy Young Award winners
Louisville Colonels (minor league) players
Major League Baseball pitchers
Milwaukee Brewers players
People from Scituate, Massachusetts
People from Hanover, Massachusetts
Philadelphia Phillies players
Seattle Rainiers players
Sportspeople from Plymouth County, Massachusetts
Sportspeople from Santa Maria, California
Stanford Cardinal baseball players
Tigres de Aragua players
American expatriate baseball players in Venezuela
Tufts University School of Dental Medicine alumni
Winston-Salem Red Sox players